Eelbeck is an extinct town in Chattahoochee County, in the U.S. state of Georgia. The GNIS classifies it as a populated place.

History
A variant name was "Millville". A post office called Eelbeck was established in 1887, and remained in operation until 1902. Henry J. Eelbeck, an early postmaster, gave the community his last name.

References

Geography of Chattahoochee County, Georgia
Ghost towns in Georgia (U.S. state)